Ivanovo is a rural locality (a village) in Sosnovskoye Rural Settlement of Priozersky District, Leningrad Oblast, in northwest Russia. Population:

References 

Rural localities in Leningrad Oblast